Tamdaotettix is a genus of cave or camel crickets in the subfamily Aemodogryllinae and tribe Diestramimini.  Originating in Asia, species have been found in the Indo-China region.

The first species to be found, Tamdaotettix vinhphuensis, was placed in the similar genus Atachycines by A.V. Gorochov, based on specimens found in Tam Dao National Park in the Vinh Phu Province of Vietnam.

Species
The Orthoptera Species File lists:
subgenus Laotettix Gorochov & Storozhenko, 2015
Tamdaotettix curvatus Gorochov & Storozhenko, 2015
Tamdaotettix inflatus Gorochov & Storozhenko, 2015
Tamdaotettix minutus Gorochov & Storozhenko, 2015
Tamdaotettix sympatricus Gorochov & Storozhenko, 2015
Tamdaotettix tarasovi Gorochov & Storozhenko, 2015
subgenus Tamdaotettix Gorochov, 1998
Tamdaotettix aculeatus Gorochov & Storozhenko, 2015
Tamdaotettix ailaoshanicus Gorochov & Storozhenko, 2019
Tamdaotettix dilutus Gorochov, 1998 - type species
Tamdaotettix flexus Gorochov & Storozhenko, 2015
Tamdaotettix laocai Gorochov & Storozhenko, 2015
Tamdaotettix longituberus Zhu, Bian & Shi, 2018
Tamdaotettix minipullus Gorochov & Storozhenko, 2019
Tamdaotettix pullus Gorochov, 1998
Tamdaotettix semipullus Gorochov, 1998
Tamdaotettix tridenticulatus Qin, Liu & Li, 2016
Tamdaotettix vinhphuensis (Gorochov, 1992)
subgenus not determined
Tamdaotettix robustus Gorochov & Storozhenko, 2015

References

External links

Ensifera genera
Rhaphidophoridae
Orthoptera of Indo-China